Elmo Bovio (July 14, 1925 – August 26, 2017) was an Argentine professional football player.

Career
Born in Junín, Buenos Aires, Bovio began playing football with local side Club Atlético Sarmiento. Next, he moved to Uruguay, where he helped Peñarol win the domestic title. Spells abroad with Inter Milan, Sociedade Esportiva Palmeiras, São Paulo FC and América de Cali would follow. He died in August 2017 at the age of 92.

References

External links
 Profile at Enciclopedia del Calcio

1925 births
2017 deaths
América de Cali footballers
Argentine expatriate footballers
Argentine expatriate sportspeople in Brazil
Argentine expatriate sportspeople in Colombia
Argentine expatriate sportspeople in Italy
Argentine expatriate sportspeople in Uruguay
Argentine footballers
Association football forwards
Categoría Primera A players
Club Atlético Sarmiento footballers
Expatriate footballers in Brazil
Expatriate footballers in Colombia
Expatriate footballers in Italy
Expatriate footballers in Uruguay
Inter Milan players
Peñarol players
São Paulo FC players
Serie A players
Sociedade Esportiva Palmeiras players
Uruguayan Primera División players
People from Junín, Buenos Aires
Sportspeople from Buenos Aires Province